The 1981 VMI Keydets football team was an American football team that represented the Virginia Military Institute (VMI) as a member of the Southern Conference (SoCon) during the 1981 NCAA Division I-A football season. In their 11th year under head coach Bob Thalman, the team compiled an overall record of 6–3–1 with a mark of 3–1–1 in conference play, placing second in the SoCon.

Schedule

References

VMI
VMI Keydets football seasons
VMI Keydets football